Alexander Vvedensky may refer to:

Alexander Vvedensky (poet) (1904–1941), Russian poet
Alexander Vvedensky (religious leader) (1889–1946),  one of the leaders of the Living Church movement

See also
Vvedensky (surname)